Wilkes-Barre Area High School is a high school in the Wilkes-Barre Area School District, located in Plains, Pennsylvania. The student body mascot is the Wolfpack. The school opened in August 2021, replacing James M. Coughlin High School, G. A. R. Memorial Junior/Senior High School, and Elmer L. Meyers Junior/Senior High School.

History 
Wilkes-Barre Area High School is the Wilkes-Barre Area School District high school in Plains, Pennsylvania. It is a replacement for James M. Coughlin High School, G. A. R. Memorial Junior/Senior High School, and Elmer L. Meyers Junior/Senior High School.

Consolidation of previous high schools 
In the 2010s, the Wilkes-Barre school district entertained various plans to reduce its schools by consolidation. The current schools were deemed inadequate or unsafe, with high costs to repair. By 2018, the school board had solidified plans for construction of a new high school to server the entire district, at a cost of $121 million. Construction of a stadium was later added to the plans.

Construction 
Several locations were entertained for a site of the new high school, including existing school sites, the Murray Complex, and a former coal mining site known as the Pagnotti Site. After the zoning board denied the district's request to build a combined school at the site of Coughlin High School, the school board decided to purchase the Pagnotti Site in Plains, Pennsylvania. Preparation of the site began by the start of Spring 2021, with ground-breaking for construction in April 2019. Changes were needed to the roads and sidewalks leading to the site. The school was ready for the 2021–2022 school year.

Consolidation criticism 
Groups were against a merger for a number of reasons. Early criticism was aimed at consolidation efforts in general. Opponents disagreed with estimates to repair the existing schools and the costs of a new school, and noted negative effects of moving to a single high school, including increased reliance on bussing and decreased community engagement. After the selection of the high school's location, criticism also included concerns about the health and safety of building a high school on coal ash over a former coal mine. The 2018 elections for school board members saw candidates expressing whether they supported or wanted to halt the merger. The board expressed that the new school would be safe and worth the costs.

Opening 
The high school opened for the 2021–2022 school year with four principals and two thousand students.

Academics

Extracurriculars 

Due to declining participation in sports, the district merged the sports programs for the 2019 school year, prior to the construction of the new high school. Based on input from students and employees, the district voted for Wolfpack to be mascot of the consolidated sports programs. The Wolfpack's first game as a team was football in August 2019.

See also
 Wilkes-Barre Area School District

References 

2021 establishments in Pennsylvania
Public high schools in Pennsylvania
Schools in Luzerne County, Pennsylvania
Educational institutions established in 2021